LaRhonza Lee Rodriguez is an American actress. Rodriguez is known for her regular role as Fabiola Torres on the Netflix comedy Never Have I Ever.

Early life 
LaRhonza Lee Rodriguez was born in Fresno, California to a Mexican-American father and an African American mother. When she was a child, her family moved to Hesperia, California. When she was in the 8th grade, she started performing roles in the school theatre at Encore Jr./Sr. High School, a school specializing in the arts, helping her develop an interest in acting. She listed herself in a talent agency and later got a role in the year 2018.

Career 

Rodriguez' first TV acting role was her portrayal of Bea in the series Class of Lies in 2018. In the same year Rodriguez portrayed Naomi on Grown-ish in 2018. In 2020, Rodriguez joined the cast of Mindy Kaling's Netflix series Never Have I Ever as Fabiola, a gay teenager who is captain of the robotics team at her high school. To prepare for the role, she tried her hand at building a robot that she named "Tinzel Washington".

Personal life 
Rodriguez has spoken about colorism and the lack of representation of dark-skinned actresses of colour in the entertainment industry. Rodriguez has future goals of releasing music albums and touring. Rodriguez identifies as queer, first coming out on National Coming Out Day in 2020.

Filmography

Television

References

External links 
 

Living people
American television actresses
21st-century American actresses
1999 births
Queer women
Queer actresses
American actresses of Mexican descent
African-American actresses
LGBT people from California
American LGBT actors
People from Victorville, California
People from Hesperia, California
Actresses from California
LGBT African Americans
LGBT Hispanic and Latino American people
21st-century African-American women